Plum Branch is a stream in Johnson County in the U.S. state of Missouri. It is a tributary of the Clear Fork of the Blackwater River.

The community of Burtville sits on the ridge above the west bank of the stream.

Plum Branch was named for the wild plum trees near its course.

See also
List of rivers of Missouri

References

Rivers of Johnson County, Missouri
Rivers of Missouri